The Coimbatore Medical College is a state government-run medical college recognized by the Medical Council of India. It is located in the city of Coimbatore, in Tamil Nadu, India. The hospital attached to the college is located near the railway station and has departments for gastroenterology, microbiology, anatomy, biochemistry, pharmacology, pathology, physiology, ophthalmology, ENT, SPM, obstretics and gynecology, orthopedics, pediatrics, respiratory medicine, radiology, diabetology, surgery, medicine, dermatology, psychiatry and FM.

History
The college was established in 1966 after G D Naidu, a  scientist from an industrial family of the city, donated the 153 acres of land to the Tamil Nadu state government under the Chief Minister K. Kamaraj.

Timeline of the Coimbatore Medical College Hospital:
 1908 – foundation stone laid by Lord Ampthill, Governor of Madras
 14 July 1909 – The hospital was inaugurated by  Governor of Madras
 1 April 1912 – The government of Madras Province took over the hospital administration from the municipality of Coimbatore
 13 August 1959 – Golden Jubilee celebrations of district headquarters hospital, Coimbatore was inaugurated by his excellency Sri Bishnuram Medhi, Governor of Madras, and presided by the honourable Sri Manickavelu, Minister of Health and Revenue, Madras State
 1966 – The Coimbatore Medical College was started
 24 November 1969 – The Directorate of Medical Education took over administration of the hospital and renamed it as Coimbatore Medical College Hospital
 July 2009 – June 2010 – Centenary year of the Coimbatore Medical College Hospital

Location
The college is just opposite Coimbatore Institute of Technology and near to The Jenney Club. This part of the city has a concentration of colleges and hospitals.

Accreditation and affiliates

The Government Headquarters Hospital near the Coimbatore Railway Junction is attached to the college and has been converted to a teaching medical institution. The college was affiliated to Madras University and was later transferred to Bharathiar University. Subsequently, it was affiliated to Tamil Nadu Dr. M.G.R. Medical University.

Facilities
The college has 30 departments with libraries and medical laboratories.

Courses
The college offers preclinical courses and elective postings, the main course being the MBBS.
 Degree courses:  MD general medicine
 MS courses: MS general surgery
 Diploma courses: DGO, DCh, DA, DRDT
 MCh courses: MCh paediatric surgery
 Paramedical courses: Diploma in Nursing, Diploma in  Pharmacy

Notable faculty
 T. S. Chandrasekar, gastroenterologist and Padma Shri recipient, specialises in endoscopy and management of liver disease

References

External links

Welcome to the Website of COIMBATORE MEDICAL COLLEGE
The Tamilnadu Dr.M.G.R. Medical University
Bharathiar University
University of Madras
Medical Education - Medical Colleges - Health & Family Welfare Department, Govt. of Tamil Nadu

Medical colleges in Tamil Nadu
Universities and colleges in Coimbatore
Academic institutions formerly affiliated with the University of Madras